Cyber Speedway (Gran Chaser in Japan) is a 1995 racing video game developed by NexTech and published by Sega for the Sega Saturn.

The game was originally called Grand Racer, but was renamed to avoid confusion with another early Saturn game, Gale Racer. It is a spiritual sequel to the 1993 computer game CyberRace; the two games share a similar theme, and vehicles designed by Syd Mead.

Regional differences
The game has different soundtracks depending on the region: one by Nextech's Kohji Hayama in Japan and Europe, and another by rock band Bygone Dogs in the United States.

Reception

Cyber Speedway received generally mediocre reviews. While critics remarked that the graphics are good and that the two-player split screen mode is a welcome treat, especially given that the Saturn's flagship racer Daytona USA is single-player only, they found fault with the gameplay, particularly the hovercraft handling. Rad Automatic of Sega Saturn Magazine argued that the vehicle's lack of traction is an inaccurate depiction of hovercraft physics, while a reviewer for Maximum felt that the hovercraft concept was a poor one to begin with, since hovercraft handle identically on all surfaces, making for "a predictable, tedious ride." A GamePro critic commented that the game was fun to play but lacked longevity, since all the tracks are easy to master and elements such as the crude cinematics in story mode limit the game's replay appeal.

American magazine Next Generation reviewed the Japanese version as an import, rating it three stars out of five, and stated that "Gran Chaser is good fun, if not all together great."

References

External links
 Cyber Speedway at GameFAQs

1995 video games
Science fiction racing games
Multiplayer and single-player video games
Nex Entertainment games
Sega video games
Sega Saturn games
Sega Saturn-only games
Split-screen multiplayer games
Video games developed in Japan